Non-Summit (Korean: 비정상회담) is a South Korean talk-variety show, part of JTBC's Monday night lineup. The show aired from July 7, 2014 to December 4, 2017.

Episodes

The show began with eleven foreign men cast as "Representatives" and three South Korean hosts.  "Visiting interns" were incorporated into the cast, as regular members took vacations, and some left the show. The debate topics are presented by visiting South Korean guests.

2017

References

External links

Episodes
Lists of variety television series episodes
Lists of South Korean television series episodes